The 2010 All-Ireland Minor Hurling Championship was the 80th staging of the All-Ireland Minor Hurling Championship since its establishment by the Gaelic Athletic Association in 1928. The championship began on 10 April and ended on 5 September 2010.

Galway entered the championship as the defending champions, however, they were beaten by Kilkenny in the All-Ireland semi-final.

On 5 September 2010, Kilkenny won the championship after a 2-10 to 0-14 defeat of Clare in the All-Ireland final at Croke Park. This was their 20th championship title overall and their first title since 2008.

Clare's Niall Arthur was the championship's top scorer with 0-50.

Results

Leinster Minor Hurling Championship

First round

Second round

Third round

Semi-finals

Final

Munster Minor Hurling Championship

First round

Quarter-final

Playoff

Semi-finals

Final

Ulster Minor Hurling Championship

First round

Second round

Quarter-finals

Semi-final

Final

All-Ireland Minor Hurling Championship

Quarter-finals

Semi-finals

Final

Championship statistics

Top scorers

Top scorers overall

Top scorers in a single game

Miscellaneous

 Armagh qualified for their first Ulster final proper since 1965.
 Clare qualified for their first Munster final since 1989.
 Clare's appearance in the All-Ireland final was only their third ever and their first since 1997.

References

Minor
All-Ireland Minor Hurling Championship